The Laguna Niguel Classic is a defunct tennis tournament that was played on the Grand Prix tennis circuit in 1977. The event was held in Laguna Niguel, California and was played on outdoor hard courts.  Andrew Pattison won the singles title while James Chico Hagey and Billy Martin partnered to win the doubles title.

Past finals

Singles

Doubles

External links
 Singles draw
 Doubles draw

Grand Prix tennis circuit
Hard court tennis tournaments
Defunct tennis tournaments in the United States
Laguna Niguel, California
Sports in Orange County, California